Tabliope is a made-up name of a "Muse" that is a comic invention of Palladas, a late Greek poet and epigrammatist, appearing in his epigram found in book 11 (Humorous and convivial - Scoptic - Σκωπτικά) of Anthologia Palatina.

The name Tabliope is made up from the word τάβλα tabla > tavla (Modern Greek τάβλι tavli "backgammon"), derived from Latin "tabula", and the segment -ιόπη as in the name of the Muse Calliope ("Τάβλ"α + Καλλ"ιόπη" = "Ταβλιόπη").

The epigram, intended to make fun of an avid backgammon player, reads:
Πάντων μουσοπόλων ἠ Καλλιόπη θεός ἐστιν • Ἠ σή Καλλιόπη Ταβλιόπη λέγεται.

"Calliope is the goddess of all adherents of the Muses [i. e. arts]; but your Calliope is called Tabliope."

Some modern sources refer to Tabliope as the goddess of the gamble (games of risk and random chance).

References

Personifications in Greek mythology